"What Goes On When the Sun Goes Down" is a song written by John Schweers, and recorded by American country music artist Ronnie Milsap.  It was released in February 1976 as the first single from the album 20/20 Vision.  The song was Milsap's fifth number one on the country chart.  The single stayed at number one for one week and spent a total of eleven weeks on the country chart.

Charts

Weekly charts

Year-end charts

References

1976 singles
Ronnie Milsap songs
RCA Records singles
Songs written by John Schweers
Song recordings produced by Tom Collins (record producer)
1976 songs